Raisbeck Aviation High School (or RAHS), part of the Highline School District, is located in Tukwila, Washington. The school is an aviation- and aerospace-themed STEM school and one of the Highline School District's small schools. It is focused on preparing students for college, careers, and citizenship. The school serves about 400 students in grades 9-12 from around Puget Sound.  Until 2013 it was known as Aviation High School.  It is next to the Museum of Flight's Aviation Pavilion exhibit near King County International Airport.

Academics
The school's approach to learning is project-based with an additional emphasis on the students presenting and defending their learning in front of industry experts.  Each student is paired with a mentor from one of the school's industry partners who is assigned to the student in Grade 9 or 10 and continues with them through graduation.  The mentor advises the students on course and career paths and assists with selection of internships where students work in local industry before graduation.  To assist with guidance of the various programs, RAHS has both a Board of Governors and a 5-person Advisory Council with representatives from local industry, businesses, and the county.

Programs
RAHS offers a full spectrum of academic programs in addition to specialty and programs unique to this school, including: 
 Satellite Team Team members are designing and building a 1U Cubesat that will be launched into low earth orbit. Students work with mentors from Planetary Resources, Blue Origin, and Boeing throughout the design process.
 Science Olympiad: RAHS competes in Science Olympiad, regularly qualifying for the state tournament. 
 Phoenix Force Robotics: The RAHS robotics team is registered as Team 2097 Phoenix Force Robotics with the FIRST Robotics Competition and styles itself as the school's "football team".
 Community Service: Students are required to complete 10 hours of community service each year for a total of 40 hours.  Acceptable services range from working at a local food bank to working as a Space Shuttle Trainer Tour Guide for Museum of Flight
 Mentor Program and Internships: Sophomores are paired with an industry mentor to assist them with college and career readiness. 
 Museum of Flight's ACE: An American Camp Association (ACA) accredited day camp with an aviation and aerospace theme.
 Aviation Career Experience (ACE) Club: An aviation and aerospace-focused club that discusses current events in the industry and hears about opportunities and pathways to attain careers in aviation.
 Speech and Debate: A Washington Interscholastic Activities Association-affiliated debate club that competes in a variety of different events, such as Lincoln-Douglas, Congress, and Extemporaneous Speaking.

Career readiness
RAHS offers students a range of career readiness programs:
 Aviation Careers:  a course for 9th graders to understand careers in the aviation and aerospace industries, including participation in job fairs and shadowing of professionals at SeaTac International Airport and the Federal Aviation Administration.
 Mentorships: industry professionals are paired with 10th graders to assist with clarifying goals, establishing timelines, and networking.
 Industry internships:  real-world employment for 10th & 11th graders in aviation related industries. 
 Senior projects:  optional for 12th graders, integrating the students' career readiness program experience.

Athletics and physical education
RAHS does not offer Physical Education (PE) classes but has an ultimate frisbee team with the name Turbulence. It runs through DiscNW, a frisbee organization in the pacific northwest and has teams run through three seasons, all students must earn state-mandated credits in Physical Education and Health to meet in order to graduate.  Students participate in athletics at their "home" high school or school district.  Credit is offered for legitimate athletic participation and individual fitness programs where a student participates in a club or intramural sport or develops his/her structured fitness program.  Health classes are offered by the school and are available on-line. There are no on-site outdoor play areas or playfields and there is no gymnasium; the indoor Commons space does convert into basketball practice courts. The school offers an after-school Ultimate Frisbee team, led by parents and volunteer staff.

Admission
Since the 2016 student admissions, an Admissions lottery process used in charter schools was implemented by the Superintendent's mandate.

Before the Class of 2020, admission to RAHS was based primarily on demonstrating an interest in and evidence of pursuing the fields of aviation and aerospace. Each applicant is interviewed by a panel for 90 minutes and must complete a 12-page application where they convey evidence for interest in attending a specialized context for learning. Only 100 students are accepted yearly (approx. >30% acceptance rate), although in the 07-08 year 124 students were accepted. In many ways, the process was like that of a private institution, except without tuition.  According to former principal, Bruce Kelly, greatest consideration is given to an applicant's passion and evidence of that passion for genuine interest in aviation and aerospace. The goals of the interview provided an authentic experience for prospective and current students. "
 
Students must volunteer for 10 hours per year in order to graduate. Students say that this goal is easily met by volunteer opportunities offered by such student-run clubs such as INTERACT and the National Honor Society.

Recognition
The school was designated by the Washington State legislature as a "lighthouse model of STEM education", which recognizes the school's best practices and student achievement results.<ref>Highline School District, Highlights 2009-2010, retrieved online 2011-09-27 </ref US News & World Report, retrieved online 2011-09-27</ref>  RAHS has been designated by the State of Washington as one of a select few Designated Existing Innovative Schools that have implemented "bold, creative, and innovative" ideas.
RAHS was ranked #1 among best high schools in Washington state by U.S. News & World Report in April 2016.

History
From 2004 to 2007, the school was located at the South Seattle Community College - Duwamish campus. From 2007 to 2013, it was housed at the former Olympic Elementary School, the previous (temporary) location of Mount Rainier High School. Construction of new facilities commenced in August 2011  and opened on September 9, 2013, renamed Raisbeck Aviation High School after major donors James D. Raisbeck and Sherry Raisbeck.

Facilities
The new 3-story, 72,000 square foot facility was designed by Bassetti Architects.  The key design feature is the building's form, with a curved cross-section inspired by the leading edge of a wing.  The design received the 2011 People's Choice Award and Polished Apple Merit Award from the regional chapter of Council of Educational Facilities Planners International.
 
The facility is located on land owned by the Museum of Flight.  Of the $44 million cost for the new facilities, 35% was through donations by individuals and private foundations, 32% by the school district, 23% by the Port of Seattle, 9% by the State of Washington, and 1% by the federal government.
 
Designed as a teaching tool and to support a rigorous education in "STEM" subjects (science, technology, engineering, and math), the building offers direct views to the adjacent Museum of Flight's airplane static outdoor exhibit which includes a Concorde and pioneering Boeing jet aircraft.  The location of the school was selected to provide ready access to the Museum of Flight's resources, located across the street at Boeing Field, and to the approximately 200 flight-related businesses nearby.
 
The museum opened the Aviation Pavilion in 2016, which spanned the gap between the high school and the Space Gallery. The covered Pavilion houses 17 of the museum's historic aircraft, including the B-17 and B-29, and allows the students to explore the history and design of flight up close.

References

External links
school site
OSPI school report card 2012-2013
greatschools.net Highline page
PTSA site
Skunkworks FIRST Robotics Team
AHS' Science Olympiad team site
Opening day photo gallery
RAHS’s Industry Partners in Learning
Phoenix Force FIRST Robotics Team
Green Energy Team

Educational institutions established in 2004
High schools in King County, Washington
Public high schools in Washington (state)
Magnet schools in Washington (state)
2004 establishments in Washington (state)